Rolf Östen Edlund (born 26 November 1934) is a Swedish discus thrower. He placed 17th at the 1958 European Championships and 24th at the 1960 Summer Olympics. He continues competing in his eightieth, winning the world title in the M80 age group at the 2015 World Masters Athletics Championships.

References

1934 births
Living people
Athletes (track and field) at the 1960 Summer Olympics
Olympic athletes of Sweden
Swedish male discus throwers